William Harward DD (d. 1589) was a Canon of Windsor from 1562 - 1589.

Family
He married (as her third husband) Alice Cavell, widow of Humphrey Cavell , in 1568.

Career
He was educated at St John's College, Cambridge, where he graduated BA in 1550, and then Queens' College, Cambridge, where he graduated MA in 1553 and was a fellow until 1559.

He was appointed:
Prebendary of Bursalis in Chichester 1558 - 1560
Rector of St Clement Danes 1559 - 1589
Vicar of Cowfold, Sussex 1560
Rector of Shadoxhurst, Kent
Rector of Farnham Royal, Buckinghamshire 
Prebendary of Winchester 1581

He was appointed to the twelfth stall in St George's Chapel, Windsor Castle in 1562, and held the stall until 1589.

Notes 

1589 deaths
Canons of Windsor
Alumni of St John's College, Cambridge
Alumni of Queens' College, Cambridge
Year of birth missing